The Holy Trinity Catholic Academy of Stafford and Stone is a group of catholic schools based within Staffordshire. The Holy Trinity Catholic Academy of Stafford and Stone is currently running. This is used for event planning, and among other things, sports competitions.

Primary
St Anne's RC Primary School
St Austin's RC Primary School]]
St John's CE Primary School
St Leonard's Primary School
St Patrick's Catholic Primary School
St Dominic's Catholic Primary School
Blessed Mother Theresa's Catholic Primary School
St Mary's Catholic Primary

Secondary
Blessed William Howard Catholic School

References

Education in Staffordshire
Roman Catholic schools in the Archdiocese of Birmingham